"Baby if," is Fayray's 9th single and last on Antinos Records. It was released on June 6, 2001 and peaked at #22. It was used as insert song in the Nippon TV drama "Ashita ga Aru sa" (in which she also starred). The coupling is a cover of Dorothy Fields's "Big Spender".

Track listing
Baby if,
Big Spender
Baby if, (Toshihiko Mori "Down To Step" Mix)

Charts 
"Baby if," - Oricon Sales Chart (Japan)

External links
FAYRAY OFFICIAL SITE

2001 singles
Fayray songs
2001 songs
Songs written by Fayray